Kian Robert Lawley (born September 2, 1995 in Sioux City, Iowa) is an American YouTuber, influencer and actor.

Lawley launched his personal YouTube channel, superkian13, in 2010. Lawley has also been a part of collaborative YouTube channels, including Our2ndLife. Lawley shares the YouTube channel "KianAndJc" with fellow YouTuber JC Caylen.

Lawley's first role in a feature film was in the 2015 film The Chosen. Lawley went on to feature in the films Shovel Buddies (2016), Boo! A Madea Halloween (2016), Boo 2! A Madea Halloween (2017), Before I Fall (2017) for which he won a Teen Choice Award, and Monster Party (2018). In 2017, Lawley worked with Caylen on their show H8TERS and starred in the Daytime Emmy Award winning first season of "Zac & Mia". In 2018, footage of Lawley resurfaced in which he used racial slurs, leading to his role in The Hate U Give being recast, and to him being dropped by his talent agency, CAA.

Early life
Kian Lawley was born on September 2, 1995, in Sioux City, Iowa. He has Polish, Irish and German heritage. At a young age, his family moved to San Clemente, California.

Career

YouTube career 
Lawley launched his first channel in 2010, under the name Superkian13. Lawley also had a collaborative channel with Sam Pottorff in 2011, named KianSam13. In 2012, Lawley started a collaborative channel Our2ndLife (commonly known as O2L) along with JC Caylen, Ricky Dillon, Trevi Moran, Connor Franta, and Sam Pottorff. The channel grew to over 2.8 million subscribers and in 2014 the group headlined a 19-city tour but they later separated in December 2014. Lawley and Caylen launched their collaborative channel KianAndJc in January 2015. At the 2015 Teen Choice Awards, Lawley won the award for Choice YouTuber. Lawley and Caylen have taken a shift on their channel with more significant productions. In July 2019, they premiered their new Big Brother-style series The Reality House which features a group of YouTubers in a house competing to win $25,000. The series did extremely well, gaining over 25 million views collectively across all ten episodes and a second season began filming in November 2019. The second season premiered in January 2020 and included more elaborate challenges and an increased prize of $50,000. The second season was also a success online with the first two seasons gaining nearly a million views per episode. A third season is pending.

Acting career 
Lawley's first starring role was in the 2015 film The Chosen in which he played a 19 year old who must contend with a demon to save his niece. In 2016, he co-starred with Bella Thorne in the comedy Shovel Buddies. In March 2016, the film was selected and premiered at SXSW Festival. In an interview about the film Lawley said "I don’t plan to ditch to YouTube, I plan to do both [acting and YouTube]". Lawley also played "Bean Boy" in the 2016 Tyler Perry comedy Boo! A Madea Halloween.

In 2017, Lawley and JC Caylen starred in and executive produced their show H8TERS, a comedy about internet celebrities, haters and millennial culture. That year, Lawley appeared alongside Zoey Deutch, Halston Sage, and Logan Miller in the film Before I Fall, for which he won the award for Choice Movie Actor: Drama at the 2017 Teen Choice Awards. In 2017 he also starred in the series "Zac & Mia", a show that follows the lives of two ordinary teenagers undergoing cancer treatment. The show was nominated for six Daytime Emmy Awards and won two: Outstanding Lead Actress in a Digital Daytime Drama Series and Outstanding Writing in a Digital Drama Series. In 2017, AwesomenessTV renewed "Zac & Mia" for a second season. In 2018, Lawley received a nomination for the Best Actor In A Digital Drama Daytime Emmy Award for his performance in "Zac & Mia".

On February 5, 2018, it was announced that Lawley had been fired from The Hate U Give due to a resurfaced video showing Lawley using racially offensive slurs. His scenes as Chris, the main character's boyfriend, were reshot with Riverdale star KJ Apa. Lawley released an apology on Twitter, stating, "I am deeply sorry to those that were effected [sic] by my choice of language. I respect Fox's decision to recast this role for The Hate U Give as it is an important story, and it would not be appropriate for me to be involved considering the actions of my past. I understand the impact and I have grown a lot and learned since then." He was subsequently dropped by his talent agency CAA.

Filmography

Film

Television

Awards and nominations

References

External links 
 

1995 births
Living people
People from San Clemente, California
Male actors from California
Male actors from Iowa
American YouTubers
American male film actors
20th-century American male actors
Twitch (service) streamers